Holler is an Ortsgemeinde – a community belonging to a Verbandsgemeinde – in the Westerwaldkreis in Rhineland-Palatinate, Germany.

Geography

The community lies in the Westerwald south of Montabaur in the Nassau Nature Park. The community belongs to the Verbandsgemeinde of Montabaur, a kind of collective municipality.

History
In 1228, Holler had its first documentary mention in the Eberbach Monastery's Oculus Memoriae.

Politics

Community council
The council is made up of 17 council members, including the extraofficial mayor (Bürgermeister), who were elected in a municipal election on 13 June 2004.
Wählergruppe Flosdorf 9 seats
Wählergruppe Metternich 7 seats

Coat of arms
The community's arms symbolize Holler's territorial allegiances over time. The golden lion stands for the Duchy of Nassau, and the inescutcheon in the lion's paws stands for the Electorate of Trier. The wavy bend sinister evokes the wealth in water that the community boasts, and the mills. The green in the arms refers to agriculture and the woods. The former branch parishes are represented by the seven billets (little rectangles), and the church's patron, Saint Margaret, is represented by the golden dragon with the sword.

Economy and infrastructure

Transport
The nearest Autobahn interchange is Montabaur on the A 3 (Cologne–Frankfurt), some 4 km away.

Fire brigade
The Holler Volunteer Fire Brigade was founded on 29 March 1925, and it likewise ensures firefighting and general aid in the Ortsgemeinden of  Daubach, Stahlhofen and Untershausen. The brigade's fleet includes a command unit (Einsatzleitwagen, ELW 1) and a small fire engine (Tragkraftspritzenfahrzeug, TSF). The ELW 1 belongs to the district and does duty both in this community and others. The brigade's current staff numbers 20 firefighters.

References

External links
Holler in the collective municipality’s Web pages 

Municipalities in Rhineland-Palatinate
Westerwaldkreis